Porphyrus of Antioch was a Patriarch of Antioch. He succeeded Flavian I in 404 and died in 412 to be replaced by Patriarch Alexander.

In the aftermath of John Chrysostom's deposal by the Synod of the Oak and a subsequent Synod in 404, John's opponents Severian, Acacius and Antiochus sought to place priests opposed to John into positions of influence. When Flavian I died shortly after the exile of John they pushed through a rapid election & consecration of Porphyrus while many residents were at the Olympic games customarily held in July or August. The populace was offended that Constantius, Flavian's adjunct and a supporter of John's, was not installed.

References

Bibliography 
 Kelly, J. N. D. (1995). Golden Mouth, the Story of John Chrysostom, Ascetic, Preacher, Bishop. New York: Cornell University Press.  ; pp. 258, 286

412 deaths
Patriarchs of Antioch
4th-century Romans
5th-century Byzantine bishops
5th-century archbishops
Year of birth unknown